"Last Exit to Brooklyn" is a song by the German musical group Modern Talking, featuring American rapper Eric Singleton. The single was released on May 7, 2001, and experienced moderate success; it spent five weeks on the German singles chart, peaking at No. 41. "Last Exit to Brooklyn" charted similarly in Austria, peaking at No. 44, and reached No. 94 in Switzerland.  The single was more successful in Russia, where it peaked at No. 7.

Track listing 
CD-Maxi Hansa 74321 85979 2 (BMG) / EAN 0743218597923 07.05.2001
 "Last Exit To Brooklyn" (Radio Edit) - 3:16
 "Last Exit To Brooklyn" (Rap Version) - 2:46
 "Last Exit To Brooklyn" (Extended Version) - 5:28
 "Last Exit To Brooklyn" (Vocal Remix) - 4:58
 "Last Exit To Brooklyn" (Rap Remix) - 4:59

Charts

References 

Modern Talking songs
2001 singles
Songs written by Dieter Bohlen
2001 songs
Ariola Records singles